Sam Manuel (born December 1, 1973) is a former American football linebacker. He was the final pick in the 1996 NFL Draft, earning him the title of Mr. Irrelevant. The San Francisco 49ers draftee played linebacker for New Mexico State University. Along with twin brother Sean, he is part of the first set of brothers taken by the same team in the same draft in NFL history.

College career
At New Mexico State, he made 30 tackles for 108 yards in losses, including 8.5 quarterback sacks, starting in all but one of 33 games.

Professional career
Manuel was drafted by the San Francisco 49ers in the 1996 NFL Draft as the 254th overall pick, earning him the title Mr. Irrelevant, a humorous award given to the last player picked in the NFL Draft. 

Manuel failed to make the team as it "had adequate depth at linebacker" and was released during final cuts, but was re-signed to the practice squad in October 1996.  

In August 1997, he was again released by the 49ers, but with no commitment by the team's manager to re-sign him to the practice squad. This prompted his twin brother Sean to quit the team the following day.

In 1998, Sam Manuel played for the Scottish Claymores of the NFL Europe league.

In February 2001, he was a linebacker on the roster of the San Francisco Demons, an XFL team.

Personal life
After retiring from football, Sam Manuel became a minister in northern California. As of March 2022, he and his wife Tenea are the East Bay Lead Ministers of the Bay Area Christian Church, according to the church website.

References

External links
 

1973 births
Living people
American football linebackers
San Francisco 49ers players
New Mexico State Aggies football players